The mountain water rat (Baiyankamys habbema) is a semiaquatic species of rodent in the family Muridae.
It is found in West Papua, Indonesia and Papua New Guinea.
Its natural habitat is rivers.

References

Rodents of Papua New Guinea
Mammals of Western New Guinea
Mammals described in 1941
Taxa named by George Henry Hamilton Tate
Taxa named by Richard Archbold
Baiyankamys
Taxonomy articles created by Polbot
Rodents of New Guinea